The US natural gas pipeline system is a complex system of pipelines that carries natural gas nationwide and for import and export for use by millions of people daily for their consumer and commercial needs.  Across the country, there are more than 210 pipeline systems that total more than 305,000 miles of interstate and intrastate pipelines.

Of the lower 48 US states, those with the most natural gas pipeline running through them are Texas (58,588 miles), Louisiana (18,900), Oklahoma (18,539), Kansas (15,386), Illinois (11,900) and California (11,770).  The states with the least natural gas pipeline are Vermont and New Hampshire.

Regulation

The US DOT Office of Pipeline Safety (OPS) administers the national regulatory program to assure the safe and environmentally sound transportation of natural gas, liquefied natural gas and hazardous liquids by pipeline.  The Federal Energy Regulatory Commission reviews and authorizes the operation of the interstate natural gas pipelines. Intrastate pipelines that run within one state and do not cross state boundaries are typically regulated by a state government agency. For example, in Texas, the Railroad Commission of Texas regulates pipelines, and in Louisiana, it is the Louisiana Department of Natural Resources.

Development

Much of the natural gas pipeline system was constructed in the 1930s and 1940s before many of the then small towns and rural areas across the country were developed into today's larger cities and suburban areas.

Many gas pipelines were made — and continue to be made today – of steel in diameters of 6 inches (15 cm) to up to 48 inches (1.2 m).  Since 9/11, for national security purposes, detailed maps of gas pipelines are not available to the general public.

Safety

Over the years, there have been many natural gas explosions involving pipelines in which people have been injured or killed.  The most recent was the 2010 San Bruno pipeline explosion that killed at least four people, injured 60 and more victims are still missing. Portions of the San Bruno pipeline had been built in 1956.

In ideal situations, pipeline inspection gauges or a “PIG” (see Pigging) is used to inspect and ensure the safe operation of natural gas pipelines.   About 63 percent of all natural gas pipelines in the US cannot be properly inspected using a PIG, or automatic robot in the pipes, because the pipelines are either too old or they twist and turn and PIGs cannot operate in them.

Many experts and studies show that the inferior oversight of gas pipelines have led to hundreds of pipeline accidents that have “killed 60 people and injured 230 others in the last five years,” according to the New York Times.  This analysis excludes the casualty figures from the 2010 San Bruno pipeline explosion that killed 7 people and injured more than 50 others.

See also
 Gulf Gateway Deepwater Port
 List of pipeline accidents
 Pipeline transport

References